Minuscule 98 (in the Gregory-Aland numbering), ε 266 (von Soden), is a Greek minuscule manuscript of the New Testament, on parchment leaves. Palaeographically it has been assigned to the 11th century. It has marginalia, it was adapted for liturgical use.

Description 

The codex contains a complete text of the four Gospels on 222 leaves (size ). The text is written stichometrically in one column per page, 25 lines per page. The initial letters in red. There are Iota adscriptum.

There is also a division according to the Ammonian Sections (no references to the Eusebian Canons).

Text 

The Greek text of the codex is a representative of the Byzantine text-type. Aland placed it in Category V. According to the Claremont Profile Method it belongs to the textual family Kx in Luke 1 and Luke 10. In Luke 20 it has mixed Byzantine text with some relationship to the M groups.

History 
The manuscript was brought by Edward Daniel Clarke (1769-1822) from the East to England. It was by one librarian collated in Matthew 6; 9; 10; Mark 5; 6; Luke 4; 5; 6 for Scholz. Wettstein's 98 is Lectionary 294. C. R. Gregory saw it in 1883.

It is currently housed at the Bodleian Library (E. D. Clarke 5), at Oxford.

See also 
 List of New Testament minuscules
 Biblical manuscript
 Textual criticism

References

Further reading 

 

Greek New Testament minuscules
11th-century biblical manuscripts
Bodleian Library collection